Sarab (also Romanized as Sarāb; also known as Sarāb-e Fash) is a village in Fash Rural District, in the Central District of Kangavar County, Kermanshah Province, Iran. At the 2006 census, its population was 28, in 9 families.

References 

Populated places in Kangavar County